Malczyce  is a village in Środa Śląska County, Lower Silesian Voivodeship, in south-western Poland, situated on the south-west bank of the river Oder (Odra). It is the seat of township Gmina Malczyce. Prior to 1945, it was part of Germany and was considered a city (it possessed civic rights).

The village has a population of 3,100.

See also
 Średzka Woda

References

Malczyce